The Huddersfield by-election was a Parliamentary by-election held on 28 November 1906. The constituency returned one Member of Parliament (MP) to the House of Commons of the United Kingdom, elected by the first past the post voting system.

Vacancy
Sir James Woodhouse had been Liberal MP here  since the 1895 general election. He resigned upon his appointment as the Rail and Canal Traffic Commissioner.

Electoral history
The seat had been Liberal since Woodhouse re-gained it in 1895. It had been a marginal seat, but Woodhouse had won with a bit to spare in 1895 and 1900. He narrowly held the seat at the last election after the intervention of a Labour candidate.

Candidates
The local Liberal Association selected the 43-year-old temperance campaigner Arthur Sherwell to defend the seat. 
The Conservatives retained the 38-year-old journalist John Foster Fraser as their candidate. The 37-year-old Thomas Russell Williams, who had stood as a candidate of the Labour Representation Committee, at the general election also stood again but this time as the candidate of the Labour Party. Although raised in Huddersfield, he worked as a mill manager in Keighley.

Campaign
Polling day was fixed for 28 November 1906. The Conservative and Labour challengers started with an advantage, as their names were known from having contested the constituency nine months earlier. The Liberals had received a setback, losing Cockermouth to the Conservatives in a by-election three months earlier. Liberal candidates in other by-elections had also seen their vote share fall from the party's general election high point. In Huddersfield, since the general election, the Liberal association had undergone reorganisation and had substantially increased its membership. Williams, the Labour candidate, was regarded as a quasi-Marxist socialist and struggled to relate his stances to local trade unionists, who wanted firm policy commitments from him. Sherwell, the Liberal candidate, supported giving women the vote. However, the Women's Social and Political Union set up a local campaign office to campaign against him.

Result
The Liberals held the seat with a slightly reduced majority.

Aftermath
The Labour Party decided that after two contests, Williams was not a good candidate and so it changed him for another for the next election, only to see their share of the vote drop further. The Huddersfield Liberals stifled the growth of the Labour Party up to the First World War.

References

Huddersfield by-election
Huddersfield by-election
1900s in Yorkshire
By-elections to the Parliament of the United Kingdom in West Yorkshire constituencies
Huddersfield by-election
Politics of Huddersfield